Life After You may also refer to:
"Life After You" (Brie Larson song), 2005 single by Brie Larson
"Life After You" (Daughtry song), 2009 single by Daughtry

See also 
"Life After Youth", 2017 studio album by Land of Talk
"Is There Life After Youth?", Canadian talk show television miniseries